Amblydoras bolivarensis is a species of thorny catfish endemic to Venezuela where it is found in the Orinoco River basin.  This species grows to a length of  SL.

References
 

Doradidae
Fish of South America
Taxa named by Augustín Fernández-Yépez
Fish described in 1968